E refers to two streetcar routes in Los Angeles, California which were operated by the Los Angeles Railway. The first incarnation was in service from 1920 to 1932 when it was redesignated as route 5. The second existed between 1920 and 1946, though it was initially assigned the route number 33. This article mostly deals with the latter.

Eagle Rock and Hawthorne

In the 1921 lettering scheme, E was assigned to a route running from Eagle Rock to Hawthorne. This service was re-designated as route 5 after 1932, and is further discussed in greater detail in its own article.

Evergreen Avenue Line
Line 33 started as a new service in 1920, formed from tracks on Euclid, 4th, and Evergreen. The line served as a branch of the F. By 1924, the route was extended north to terminate at Ramona Boulevard and Miller Avenue.

This line designation was changed to the letter E for service starting May 19, 1939. After June 30, 1946, the route was changed to bus operations.

Sources

External links
 

Los Angeles Railway routes
Railway services introduced in 1920
1920 establishments in California
Railway services discontinued in 1946
1946 disestablishments in California